Paul Pfeiffer may refer to:

Paul Pfeiffer (artist) (born 1966), American video artist
Paul Pfeiffer (chemist) (1875–1951), German chemist
Paul Pfeiffer, a fictional character from the television series The Wonder Years

See also
Paul Pfeifer, American jurist and politician